Virgil Vilela Gomis (born 16 April 1999) is a French professional footballer who plays as a forward for Paris FC B.

Career

Nottingham Forest
After three seasons with the Nottingham Forest academy, Gomis joined National League side Braintree Town on a one-month loan on 31 October 2018, where he scored on his debut with the club. On 31 January 2019, Gomis again moved on loan, this time to Forest's city rivals Notts County, where he would remain for the rest of the 2018-19 season.

On 9 August 2019, Gomis joined League Two side Macclesfield Town on loan for the season. He scored his first goal for Macclesfield in an EFL Cup tie against Blackpool on 13 August 2019. Gomis was recalled from his loan early by Nottingham Forest on 3 January 2020.

On 16 October 2020, Gomis joined Grimsby Town on a season-long loan. On 5 January 2021, Grimsby decided to terminate his loan prematurely following only six first team appearances across all competitions.

Following the 2020-21 season, Gomis was not listed on Forest's retained player list.

Paris FC
Gomis appeared for Paris FC's Championnat National 3 reserve team in September 2021.

References

1999 births
Living people
French footballers
Association football forwards
Nottingham Forest F.C. players
Braintree Town F.C. players
Notts County F.C. players
Macclesfield Town F.C. players
Grimsby Town F.C. players
National League (English football) players
English Football League players
French expatriate footballers
Expatriate footballers in England
French expatriate sportspeople in England
Paris FC players